The mayor of the Calais Staple was basically the head of the merchants of English-occupied Calais from 1363 to 1558. The actual rule over Calais was in the hands of the captains, lieutenants and lords deputies. Among the mayors of the Calais Staple we find:

Mid-14th Century: John Curteys
1394: Robert Savage
1407: Dick Whittington
1434: Hamon Sutton
Unknown date, second half 14th century: John Torngold

References

History of Calais
Merchants of the Staple